Calonga is a town and commune in Cunene, Angola.

It may also refer to:
Lorenzo Calonga (1929–2003), Paraguayan footballer
Lucio Calonga (1939–2007), Paraguayan footballer

See also
Calonge (disambiguation)